José David Sierra, better known as Jessica Wild (born June 10, 1980), is a Puerto Rican drag queen, professional make-up artist, and reality television personality, best known as a contestant on the second season of RuPaul's Drag Race.

Biography
Wild was born in San Juan but raised in Caguas, Puerto Rico. He is the youngest of three siblings. He started his drag career in 1998 at local San Juan gay venues such as Krash (also known as Eros) and Starz. His drag name comes from a girl whom he dated as a teenager and "Wild" comes from an adjective he used to describe his dance performances. He cites his inspirations as Madonna, Gloria Estefan, Lady Gaga, Jennifer Lopez, Olga Tañón, Gloria Trevi, Mónica Naranjo, and Thalía.

Television
Wild won an online vote to become a cast member of the second season of Logo's popular reality series, RuPaul's Drag Race, which premiered on the network in February 2010. He was eliminated in the seventh episode of the season, which first aired on March 22, 2010.

Besides his participation on RuPaul's Drag Race, Wild (along with season one contestant Nina Flowers) has performed on the popular Puerto Rican television program Objetivo Fama, which airs throughout the United States and Latin America. He also has made appearances on No te Duermas and other local television programs and specials. He was in a commercial for Absolut Vodka among a series with other season two queens in 2011. In August 2015, Wild, along with 29 other Drag Queens, performed live with Miley Cyrus at the MTV VMAS.

In 2022, Jessica Wild appeared in Jennifer Lopez's performance at the 2022 iHeartRadio Music Awards.

Music
Since appearing on RuPaul's Drag Race, Wild appeared in a music video for the popular reggaeton band Calle 13, and fielded offers to record a dance/techno music album. He has performed live with Puerto Rican rock band Rebeldía.

In January 2011, Wild (in collaboration with DJ Ranny) released his first dance single "You Like it Wild," which is available for purchase via iTunes and many commercial music sites. The single debuted at number forty-two on the Billboard Hot Dance Club Songs, before peaking at number thirty. In addition, he recorded a duet with the Mexican singer Fedro entitled "Maquillaje" 'which is part of the singer's new album. He has also performed on stage with Mexican singer Gloria Trevi.

In July 2021, Wild returned to RuPaul's Drag Race All Stars (season 6) as a lip sync assassin and won the lip sync against Jan.

Filmography

Television

Web series

Discography
 Singles

References

External links 
 

Jessica Wild fan page on Facebook
Jessica Wild interview on Logo

1980 births
Living people
Puerto Rican LGBT musicians
American LGBT musicians
People from San Juan, Puerto Rico
Puerto Rican drag queens
Jessica Wild
Hispanic and Latino American drag queens
American make-up artists